Simona Soukupova is a Czech mixed martial artist who competes at Invicta FC in the Atomweight division and has fought 3 times for the organization.

Mixed martial arts record

|-
|Loss
|align=center|6–6–1
|Svetlana Gotsyk
|Decision (split)
|WWFC 9
|
|align=center|3
|align=center|5:00
|Kiev, Ukraine
|
|-
|Win
|align=center|6–5–1
|Anna Bezhenar
|Decision (unanimous)
|XFN 2: World Cup of MMA
|
|align=center|3
|align=center|5:00
|Prague, Czech Republic
|
|-
|Loss
|align=center|5–5–1
|Herica Tiburcio
|Decision (unanimous)
|Invicta FC 20: Evinger vs. Kunitskaya
|
|align=center|3
|align=center|5:00
|Kansas City, Missouri, United States
|
|-
|Loss
|align=center|5–4–1
|Tessa Simpson
|Decision (unanimous)
|Invicta FC 18: Grasso vs. Esquibel
|
|align=center|3
|align=center|5:00
|Kansas City, Missouri, United States
|
|-
|Win
|align=center|5–3–1
|Iman Darabi
|TKO (knees)
|IRFA 8
|
|align=center|2
|align=center|1:35
|Solna, Stockholm, Sweden
|
|-
|Loss
|align=center|4–3–1
|Karolina Kowalkiewicz
|Decision (unanimous)
|KSW 24: Clash of the Giants
|
|align=center|3
|align=center|5:00
|Łódź, Poland
|
|-
|Win
|align=center|4–2–1
|Cassie Rodish
|Submission (standing guillotine choke)
|Invicta FC 5: Penne vs. Waterson
|
|align=center|2
|align=center|3:20
|Kansas City, Missouri, United States
|
|-
|Win
|align=center|3–2–1
|Elodie Puget
|Submission (armbar)
|Kayo MMA
|
|align=center|1
|align=center|4:21
|Watford, England
|
|-
|Draw
|align=center|2–2–1
|Katja Kankaanpaa
|Draw (split)
|Botnia Punishment 12
|
|align=center|3
|align=center|5:00
|Seinajoki, Finland
|
|-
|Loss
|align=center|2–2
|Felice Herrig
|Decision (unanimous)
|XFC 19: Charlotte Showdown
|
|align=center|3
|align=center|5:00
|Charlotte, North Carolina, United States
|
|-
|Loss
|align=center|2–1
|Karla Benitez
|Decision (unanimous)
|Hombres de Honor
|
|align=center|3
|align=center|5:00
|Spain
|
|-
|Win
|align=center|2–0
|Celine Haga
|TKO (punches)
|ECFF Night of Champions
|
|align=center|2
|align=center|1:50
|Norwich, Norfolk, England
|
|-
|Win
|align=center|1–0
|Lisa Newton
|TKO (corner stoppage)
|Kayo MMA
|
|align=center|1
|align=center|5:00
|Watford, England
|
|-

References

External links
 

1977 births
Female Muay Thai practitioners
Atomweight mixed martial artists
Lightweight kickboxers
Czech female mixed martial artists
Mixed martial artists utilizing Muay Thai 
Mixed martial artists utilizing taekwondo
Mixed martial artists utilizing boxing
Mixed martial artists utilizing judo
Czech Muay Thai practitioners
Czech female taekwondo practitioners
Czech female judoka
Living people